Leigh Bruce ‘Tracker’ Tilmouth (1954 – 28 February 2015) was a Northern Territory Aboriginal activist.

Tilmouth was an Arrente man who was born in the Alice Springs region. He was part of the stolen generation, being taken from his family at the age of three to Retta Dixon Home in Darwin and later raised on Croker Island.

Tilmouth helped establish the Central Australian Aboriginal Legal Aid Service and the Aboriginal health service in the south of the Northern Territory. He also served as director of the Central Land Council. He was a lifetime member of the Australian Labor Party and was, before pulling out, in the running to be the party's senator for the Northern Territory.

Tilmouth died on Saturday 28 February 2015 after suffering with cancer and heart complications. He was given a state funeral in Darwin on 12 March 2015.

References

1953 births
2015 deaths
Arrernte people
Australian indigenous rights activists
Australian Labor Party politicians
Members of the Stolen Generations
People from Alice Springs